Marcos Baghdatis was the defending champion after defeating Richard Gasquet in the 2010 final but had to withdraw from the tournament in 2011.
Gilles Simon won the championships by beating 4th seed Viktor Troicki 7–5, 7–6(4) in the final.

Seeds
The top four seeds receive a bye to the second round.

Qualifying

Draw

Finals

Top half

Bottom half

References
Main Draw
Qualifying Draw

Men's
Medibank International Sydney - Men's Singles